The 2005 Idaho Vandals football team represented the University of Idaho during the 2005 NCAA Division I-A football season. Idaho competed as a first-year member of the Western Athletic Conference (WAC), and played their home games in the Kibbie Dome, an indoor facility on campus in Moscow, Idaho. The Vandals were led by second-year head coach Nick Holt, and finished their first season in the WAC with a 2–9 overall record and 2–6 in conference play, the sixth consecutive season with a losing record.

The Vandals played the previous four seasons (2001–2004) as a "football only" member of the Sun Belt Conference, following the discontinuation of football by the Big West.  Other new teams in the WAC in 2005 were New Mexico State and Utah State.

After the season, Holt departed for an assistant's position in the NFL in February 2006, joining the staff of the St. Louis Rams as defensive line coach under first-year head coach Scott Linehan, a former Vandal player and assistant coach. Holt and Linehan had coached together as assistants at both Idaho and Louisville under John L. Smith. Days later, Holt changed his mind and accepted a higher-paying offer as defensive coordinator back at USC under head coach Pete Carroll.

Former Idaho head coach Dennis Erickson, recently of the San Francisco 49ers, succeeded Holt for the 2006 season.

Schedule

Idaho's reported home attendance for 2005 was 60,700 for four games.The maximum was 15,635 for the Hawaii game on September 24,the minimum was 15,006 for the Utah State game on October 1.

References

External links
Idaho Argonaut – student newspaper – 2005 editions

Idaho
Idaho Vandals football seasons
Idaho Vandals football